Chalekah (also Romanized as Chālekah; also known as Chālegah) is a village in Beshiva Pataq Rural District, in the Central District of Sarpol-e Zahab County, Kermanshah Province, Iran. At the 2006 census, its population was 299, in 66 families.

References 

Populated places in Sarpol-e Zahab County